Novosyolovo is a rural locality (a village) in Pokrovskoye Rural Settlement, Velikoustyugsky District, Vologda Oblast, Russia. The population was 28 as of 2002.

Geography 
The distance to Veliky Ustyug is 19.5 km, to Ilyinskoye is 10.5 km. Kulakovo is the nearest rural locality.

References 

Rural localities in Velikoustyugsky District